Zofiabaatar is a genus of extinct mammal from the Upper Jurassic period.  It was a relatively early member of the extinct order Multituberculata within the suborder "Plagiaulacida". It lived in North America along with dinosaurs such as Diplodocus and Allosaurus.

The primary species is Zofiabaatar pulcher. Fossils have been found in the Upper Jurassic Morrison Formation of Wyoming (U.S.). It seems to have been a rather specialized creature, judging by the dentary. Zofiabaataridae are believed to belong to the allodontid line.

It is present in stratigraphic zone 6.

The species is named after the Polish paleontologist Zofia Kielan-Jaworowska.

References
 Simpson. "Mesozoic Mammalia. VII. Taxonomy of Morrison multituberculates", American Journal of Science. 1927. Pages 36–38.
 Kielan-Jaworowska, Z. and J.H. Hurum. "Phylogeny and Systematics of multituberculate mammals", Paleontology. 44. Pages 389–429.

Multituberculates
Morrison mammals
Taxa named by Kenneth Carpenter
Taxa named by Robert T. Bakker
Fossil taxa described in 1990
Prehistoric mammal genera